Ross Raisin FRSL (born 1979) is a British novelist.

Biography
Ross Raisin was born and brought up in Silsden, West Yorkshire, attending Bradford Grammar School. He is the author of three novels: A Natural (2017), Waterline (2011) and God’s Own Country (2008). His work has won and been shortlisted for ten literary awards.

He won the Sunday Times Young Writer of the Year award in 2009, and in 2013 was named on Granta's once a decade Best of Young British Novelists list.

He was elected a Fellow of the Royal Society of Literature in 2018.

His book for the Read This series, on the practice of fiction writing: Read This if you Want to be a Great Writer was published by Laurence King Publishing in April 2018  He has written short stories for Granta, Prospect, Esquire, Dazed and Confused, the Sunday Times, BBC Radio Three and Four, and for anthologies such as: Best British Short Stories (Salt, 2013).

He lives in London with his wife and two children.

Awards and honours 

 Royal Society of Literature Fellowship (2018)
 Society of Authors Scholarship (2017)
 Granta Best of Young British Novelists list, 2013
 IMPAC Dublin Literary Award, shortlist (2010)
 Sunday Times Young Writer of the Year Award, winner (2009)
 Authors’ Club First Novel Award, shortlist (2009)
 Betty Trask, Award winner (2008)
 Guardian First Book Award, shortlist (2008)
 Dylan Thomas Prize, shortlist (2008)
 Guildford Literary Festival First Novel Award, winner (2008)
 John Llwellyn Rhys Prize, shortlist (2008)
 Portico Prize for Literature, shortlist (2008)

Publications 

 God's Own Country, novel, 2008 (Viking, Penguin)
 Waterline, novel, 2011 (Viking, Penguin)
 A Natural, 2017 (Jonathan Cape, Random House)
 Read This if you Want to be a Great Writer, 2018 (part of the Read This series on the creative arts, Laurence King)

Raisin's debut novel God's Own Country (titled Out Backward in North America) was published in 2008. It was shortlisted for the Guardian First Book Award and the John Llewellyn Rhys Prize, and won a Betty Trask Award. The novel focuses on Sam Marsdyke, a disturbed adolescent living in a harsh rural environment, and follows his journey from isolated oddity to outright insanity. Thomas Meaney in The Washington Post compared the novel favorably to Anthony Burgess's A Clockwork Orange, and said "Out Backward more convincingly registers the internal logic of unredeemable delinquency." Writing in The Guardian Justine Jordan described the novel as "an absorbing read", which marked Raisin out as "a young writer to watch". In April 2009 the book won Raisin the Sunday Times Young Writer of the Year Award. He is currently a writer-in-residence for the charity First Story.

References 

Living people
Alumni of King's College London
Alumni of Goldsmiths, University of London
British writers
People from Silsden
1979 births
People educated at Bradford Grammar School